Crossword Plus is a Nintendo 3DS video game that was released on October 1, 2012 in North America. It is the sequel to the 2008 game Crosswords DS.

Gameplay
Players can complete over 1,000 pre-packaged crossword puzzles, which are categorized into four difficulties (Easy, Medium, Hard, and Expert). Boxes are filled in with letters using a touch-screen interface. There is also a hint system, which can be used to provide the player with a clue or fill in letters or entire words. Players can use SpotPass or StreetPass to receive free additional puzzles. Other additional game modes are anagrams, word searches, and word of the day.

Reception

Nintendo Life rated the game a 6/10, stating "the game's biggest draw is the wide selection of puzzles", but criticizing it for its lack of new additions and changes from the original game. Both giving the game an 8/10, Modojo and Nintendo World Report's Neal Ronaghan praised the game's variety of puzzles, but criticized it for its faulty letter recognition.

References

2012 video games
Nintendo 3DS games
Nintendo 3DS-only games
Nintendo games
Nintendo Software Technology games
North America-exclusive video games
Crossword video games
Video games developed in the United States
Video game sequels
Single-player video games